Hélène Vachon (born 1947) is a Canadian writer living in Quebec.

She was born in Quebec City, and studied modern French literature at the Université de Paris X and textual criticism at Laval University. She then worked for the Quebec Ministry of Culture and Communications. Vachon lives on the Île d'Orléans.

Selected works 
 Le sixième arrêt, children's literature (1995), received the 
 Le plus proche voisin (1998), received the 
 Le délire de Somerset, children's literature (1999), shortlisted for a Governor General's Award
 Le Piège de l’ombre, children's literature (2000)
 L’oiseau de passage, children's literature (2001), received the Governor General's Award for French-language children's literature and a Mr. Christie's Book Award
 La tête ailleurs, novel (2002), shortlisted for the Governor General's Award for French-language fiction
 Singuliers voyageurs, children's literature (2004)
 L’Arbre tombé, children's literature (2007)
 Mon look d'enfer, children's literature (2008)
 La Manière Barrow, novel (2013)

References 

1947 births
Living people
French Quebecers
Governor General's Award-winning children's writers
Canadian novelists in French
Writers from Quebec City
Canadian children's writers in French
Canadian women children's writers
Canadian women novelists
20th-century Canadian novelists
20th-century Canadian women writers
21st-century Canadian novelists
21st-century Canadian women writers